Fortunato, the Italian form of the Latin Fortunatus, may refer to:

 Saint Fortunatus (disambiguation), San Fortunato
 Fortunato (yacht), a 205-foot megayacht built by Feadship in 2000
 Fortunato (film), 1942 Spanish film

People

Surname
 Andrea Fortunato (1971–1995), Italian footballer
 Bartolomé Fortunato (born 1974), American major league baseball pitcher
 Flavia Fortunato (born 1964), Italian pop singer, actress and television presenter
 Jacopo Fortunato (born 1990), Italian footballer
 Joe Fortunato (American football) (born 1930), former American football linebacker in the National Football League
 Joe Fortunato (coach) (1918–2004), American college sports coach and college athletics administrator
 René Fortunato (born 1958), Dominican director, screenwriter and producer
 Stefano Fortunato (born 1990), Italian footballer

Given name
 Fortunato of Brescia (1701–1754), Italian anatomist
 Fortunato Arriola (1827–1872), Mexican landscape and portrait painter who lived in San Francisco, California, United States
 Fortunato Depero (1892–1960), Italian futurist painter, writer, sculptor and graphic designer
 Fortunato Mizzi (1844–1905), founder of Malta's Reform Party
 Fortunato Brescia Tassano (fl. 1889–1951), Italian-born Peruvian businessman
 António Fortunato de Figueiredo (1903–1981), Indian violinist and conductor

Fictional characters
 Fortunato, a character in Edgar Allan Poe's "The Cask of Amontillado"
 Don Fortunato, a Marvel Comics villain
 Leon Fortunato, a character in the Left Behind Series
 Fortunato (Wild Cards), a character in the Wild Cards series